The Geehi River, a perennial river of the Murray catchment of the Murray-Darling basin, is located in the Snowy Mountains region of New South Wales, Australia.

Course and features
The Geehi River rises below Mount Jagungal, part of Strumbo Range within the Kosciuszko National Park, and flows generally southwest before reaching its confluence with the Swampy Plain River, below Mount Youngal, near the locality of Geehi. The river descends  over its  course.

The Alpine Way road crosses the Geehi River near its confluence with the Swampy Plain River. The historic and iconic Hannels Spur Track up to the summit of Mt. Kocsiuszko commences near the confluence of the Geehi River and the Swampy Plains River. This is the overlooked 3rd and most challenging route to the summit of Australia's highest mountain and Australia's biggest vertical ascent - 1800metres.  Difficult

See also

 List of rivers of New South Wales (A-K)
 List of rivers of Australia
 Rivers of New South Wales
 Snowy Mountains Scheme

References

External links
 
Snowy Flow Response Monitoring and Modelling

Rivers of New South Wales
Snowy Mountains
Murray-Darling basin